Bożydar refers to the following places in Poland:

 Bożydar, Greater Poland Voivodeship
 Bożydar, Świętokrzyskie Voivodeship